Chronogaster is a genus of nematodes.

The Encyclopedia of Life (eol) places the genus in the order Araeolaimida and the family Leptolaimidae whereas Wikispecies and the World Register of Marine Species (WoRMS) place the genus in the order Plectida, superfamily Plectoidea and family Chronogastridae, where it is the type genus of the family.

References

External links 

 
 Chronogaster at the World Register of Marine Spacies (WoRMS)

Chromadorea genera
Araeolaimida